Kinnaird Castle can refer to one of several castles in Scotland:

Kinnaird Castle, Brechin, Angus
Kinnaird Castle, Fraserburgh, Aberdeenshire
Kinnaird Castle, Kinnaird, Gowrie, Perth & Kinross

See also
 Kinnairdy Castle, Aberdeenshire, Scotland